The Wayatinah Power Station is a run-of-the-river hydroelectric power station located in the Central Highlands region of Tasmania, Australia. The power station is situated on the Lower River Derwent catchment and is owned and operated by Hydro Tasmania.

Technical details
Part of the Derwent scheme that comprises eleven hydroelectric power stations, the Wayatinah Power Station is the sixth power station in the scheme and the second power station in the lower run-of-river system. The power station is located aboveground below Wayatinah Lagoon, a small storage created by the rock-filled Wayatinah Dam on the Derwent River below its junction with the Nive River. Water from the Derwent from Liapootah Power Station and spill from Liapootah Dam flows into Wayatinah Lagoon. It then descends  through three steel penstocks to the Wayatinah Power Station. The tunnel intake structure is provided with two vertical lift, gravity close intake gates designed to cut off full flow. Each of the three steel penstocks is provided with a hilltop valve designed to close under full flow.

Within the station building, each turbine has a fully embedded spiral casing and water flow is controlled by a spherical rotary main inlet valve and a turbine relief valve designed to prevent spiral casing overpressure. The station output, estimated to be  annually, is fed to TasNetworks' transmission grid via an 11 kV/220 kV three-phase English Electric generator transformer to the outdoor switchyard. An 11 kV indoor switchgear system also supplies a distribution yard that supplies power to the local area from Wayatinah village to
 and includes the power stations of Liapootah, Wayatinah, Catagunya, Repulse and Cluny.

See also 

List of power stations in Tasmania

References

External links
Hydro Tasmania page on the Lower Derwent

Energy infrastructure completed in 1957
Hydroelectric power stations in Tasmania
Central Highlands (Tasmania)
Run-of-the-river power stations
1957 establishments in Australia